John Patterson Swain (23 October 1899 – 29 August 1960) was a New Zealand rugby union player. He played 16 matches on that tour, including all four internationals.

References

1899 births
1960 deaths
Rugby union players from Sydney
Australian emigrants to New Zealand
New Zealand rugby union players
New Zealand international rugby union players
Hawke's Bay rugby union players
Wellington rugby union players
Rugby union hookers